Daniel X: Watch the Skies is a teen science fiction novel written by James Patterson and Ned Rust. It is the second novel in the Daniel X series and was released on July 27, 2009.

Plot summary
The evil alien Daniel has to defeat in this novel – No. 5 on the List of Alien Outlaws on Earth – is torturing and killing humans in order to create an entertaining reality television show for his home planet, and to do this, he plans to use humans to breed an army of himself.

See also

References

External links 
 Official Daniel X website
 Daniel X: Watch the Skies at the author's official website
 Daniel X: Watch the Skies at Fantastic Fiction

2009 American novels

Little, Brown and Company books
Novels about orphans
Young adult novels by James Patterson
Children's science fiction novels
2009 children's books
Collaborative novels